Al Gregg (born 9 June 1963 in West Brompton, London, England) is an English actor, writer and musician who has appeared in a variety of theatre, television, film, commercials and voice overs.

After leaving school at sixteen he played guitar and sang in various punk bands including Three Minute Warning/Four Minds Crack and then The Wall, (who were produced by both Steve Jones of the Sex Pistols and Jimmy Pursey from Sham 69), and appeared in music magazines like Melody Maker, and recorded on the Wall's Day Tripper 12" and EP, recorded at the Crass Southern Studios in 1982. Recently the Wall have reformed and appeared at the Rebellion Festival punk festival in Blackpool and on UK tours. After the band's split in 1983, he trained as an actor at the Rose Bruford College of Speech and Drama (1985–88). His many television credits include, EastEnders, Casualty, Conquest, Van Der Valk, The Bill, Soldier Soldier, Inspector Alleyn and Lovejoy. He has recently appeared in the films The Real American: Joe McCarthy; Operation Chastity; The Final; Dead Ideas; A Modest Proposal. Most recently Harrigan; Dr Easy; Squat; Write the Future, starring Wayne Rooney and directed by Alejandro González Iñárritu, has appeared in Fuelling the Future for the London Olympics/Paralympics 2012. He played the lead role of Clint Hill in film A Life for Kennedy and the main role of Malcolm Riley in Flawless a domestic violence psychological drama, directed by Tito Sacchi for Valhalla Pictures and the charity ManKind. Most recently, Al has appeared in the main role of Robert Kissel in Passport to Murder for Sky Television, and the lead role of Pierre Korkie in hostage series Captive, produced by Doug Liman for Netflix.

Al is also a leading UK voice over artist for well over twenty five years and has voiced film trailers for T2 Trainspotting; Dunkirk (2017 Film); video games Assassin's Creed and is a brand voice for many international companies including; Purina, British Airways, DSM, Grundig, Sisal, Fitbit, Garmin, Mastercard, Ferrero Rocher, Gucci, Floris, Chevrolet, Jaguar and Huawei.

Alongside his acting, Gregg was the lead guitarist for rock singer Caroline Alexander (Organic/Universal) produced by Ace (Skunk Anansie) and also for Rip It Up (Ankh Music). Alongside extensive recording work, he frequently appeared live, including headlining The Forum (2006) and supporting Girlschool at the London Astoria (2005). In 2016, Al re-appeared with the Wall at the 40th anniversary Rebellion Punk festival, at the Opera House, Winter Gardens, Blackpool, and also appeared with the band live on their UK tour, co headlining with Spizz Energi as well as recording new material. In February 2022 the four track 'Back to the Wall - Manchuria' EP by The Wall was released by Spectacle Music Ltd featuring two previously unreleased Wall songs written by Ian Lowery and two new songs written by Al Gregg, as a tribute to both Ian Lowery and Andy Griffiths. The EP received positive reviews from the likes of Louder than War and Phonotonal and regular international radio play.

Al Gregg's debut novel The Wrong Outfit, about football and punk rock, published by AuthorHouse UK, was released in the autumn of 2010 to much critical acclaim: The Wrong Outfit is excellent. It just has to be read. It's epic, exhilarating, spellbinding and a remarkable read'. Vital Football

He also co-wrote and composed the original music in the Punk play 'Reality Chokes', and appeared as one of the main characters Dan, both in London and at the Edinburgh Festival in 2009, garnering some five star reviews and a nomination for the MTMUK awards. His other writing includes Next (BBC), and two historical plays 'Soldiers of Babylon' and 'Murder, My Lord'. He has also co-adapted with his brother Rob Gregg, Aristophanes' comedy 'Frogs Reimagined' as a play about music, for productions in Greece, Cyprus and at the Stockton Theatre, New Jersey in the US in 2014. Further musical co-adaptations of Shakespeare, 'Midsummer Night's Scream' (performed at the Dante Hall Theatre, Atlantic City US (2013) and 'Much ado 'bout Nothin' in 2014. A further play with music about Syd Barrett of Pink Floyd and his alter ego Arnold Layne titled 'Piper' is due for.
He became the voice for the new Mighty Boosh – inspired podcast animation series CodEye, written by Martin Kaluza and Martin Cooper with drawings by Luke Harkus-Jeffries.

References 
 Gregg, Al (2010) The Wrong Outfit, AuthorHouse UK, 
 Glasper, Ian (2004) Burning Britain: The History of UK Punk 1980–1984, Cherry Red Books,

External links
 
 The Wall band website

Living people
1963 births
20th-century English male actors
21st-century English male actors
21st-century English novelists
Male actors from London
English male film actors
English male stage actors
English rock guitarists
Lead guitarists
Musicians from London
English male novelists
21st-century English male writers